The lined sole (Achirus lineatus) is a ray-finned flatfish found in the Western Atlantic. Its common length is 17 cm. Often considered a trash fish in commercial trawling, it is of little or no economic value.

Diet and habitat

This species feeds on worms, crustaceans and small fishes, and occurs mainly in brackish or hypersaline lagoons, or on sandy-muddy bottoms of estuaries, as well as the littoral zone.  It hides itself in the substrate, leaving its eyes uncovered to view prey and predators. It can easily disguise itself in the environment and can be associated with reefs and be found at depths to 20 m.

Reproduction and lifecycle

Reproduction appears to occur year-round, at least in some portions of the animal's range. Juveniles have a brief planktonic life, moving quickly to the benthic stage. Its growth rate is relatively slow.

Distribution
Commonly, it is caught in the Western Atlantic bight: Florida and northern Gulf of Mexico to northern Argentina. A. lineatus is a broadly euryhaline species, having a wide salinity tolerance. Individuals have been collected in near-fresh water from the upper portions of the St. Lucie and Caloosahatchee estuaries, Florida.

Common misidentified species 
Careful examination allows A. lineatus and other right-eyed achirids to be distinguished from all co-occurring flatfish of the families Bothidae (lefteye flounders) and Cynoglossidae (tonguefishes), all of which have the left side up. The right-eyed flounders of family Pleuronectidae typically inhabit colder waters than A. lineatus. Within the Achiridae, the absence of vertical body bars should be sufficient to distinguish A. lineatus from three co-occurring species, the naked sole (Gymnachirus melas) and fringed sole (G. texae). The lined sole is sometimes confused with the hogchoker, (Trinectes maculatus) which is distinguished (at over 15 mm total length) by the latter's total lack of pectoral fin rays. Lined sole are also easily differentiated from scrawled sole (Trinectes inscriptus), whose side-up body is covered by a network of irregular dark lines.

References

External links

Achetus lineatus at fishbase.org
 Munroe, T.A., 2002. Achiridae. American soles. p. 1925–1933. In K.E. Carpenter (ed.) FAO species identification guide for fishery purposes. The living marine resources of the Western Central Atlantic. Vol. 3: Bony fishes part 2 (Opistognathidae to Molidae), sea turtles and marine mammals

Pleuronectiformes
Fauna of the Southeastern United States
Fish of the Western Atlantic
Fish described in 1758
Taxa named by Carl Linnaeus